Intelsat V F-1 (or Intelsat 501) was a geostationary communications satellite built by Ford Aerospace, it was owned by COMSAT. Launched in 1981, it was the second of fifteen Intelsat V satellites to be launched. The satellite was based on the Intelsat V platform and its estimated useful life was seven years.

Satellite 
The satellite was box-shaped, measuring 1.66 by 2.1 by 1.77 metres; solar arrays spanned 15.9 metres tip to tip. The arrays, supplemented by nickel-hydrogen batteries during eclipse, provided 1800 watts of power. The payload housed 21 C-band and 4 Ku-band transponders. It could accommodate 15,000 two-way voice circuits and two TV channels simultaneously. It had a launch mass of 1928 kg. The satellite was deactivated in February 1997.

Launch 
The satellite was successfully launched into space on 23 May 1981, at 22:42:00 UTC, by means of an Atlas SLV-3D Centaur vehicle from the CCAFS, LC-36B.

See also 

 1981 in spaceflight

References 

Spacecraft launched in 1981
Intelsat satellites
1981 in spaceflight